Pseudocheilinus is a genus of wrasses native to the Indian and Pacific Oceans.

Species
The currently recognized species in this genus are:
 Pseudocheilinus citrinus J. E. Randall, 1999
 Pseudocheilinus dispilus J. E. Randall, 1999
 Pseudocheilinus evanidus D. S. Jordan & Evermann, 1903 (striated wrasse)
 Pseudocheilinus hexataenia (Bleeker, 1857) (six-line wrasse)
 Pseudocheilinus ocellatus J. E. Randall, 1999 (white-barred wrasse)
 Pseudocheilinus octotaenia O. P. Jenkins, 1901 (eight-lined wrasse)
 Pseudocheilinus tetrataenia L. P. Schultz, 1960 (four-lined wrasse)

References

 
Labridae
Taxa named by Pieter Bleeker
Marine fish genera